The Gasworks Tunnel is a set of three parallel railway tunnels carrying the East Coast Main Line from London King's Cross terminus under Regent's Canal. Each  bore has two tracks.

The first of the multiple tunnels was built as part of the construction of the Great Northern Railway opening in 1852. The original tunnel is now the middle of three parallel bores. A second tunnel to the west was built in 1878 and a third one to the east in 1892.

The eastern tunnel was taken out of use in 1977 during a significant remodelling of the approach to King's Cross station which included a completely new layout between the tunnels and the platforms, the introduction of bi-directional working in the tunnels, works to improve headroom at the southern end of the tunnels and changing the usage of lines between the remaining bores to concentrate suburban services in the western tunnel and long-distance services in the central.

In 2018, Network Rail announced it proposed to reinstate the eastern tunnel during another major remodelling of the approaches to King's Cross. It opened to traffic on 26 April 2021.

References

External links

East Coast Main Line
Kings Cross, London
Railway tunnels in London
Tunnels completed in 1852